Dear Diary may refer to:

Film and television 
 Dear Diary (1993 film) or Caro diario, an Italian film directed by Nanni Moretti
 Dear Diary (1996 film), a failed U.S. TV pilot released as a short film in 1996
 "Dear Diary", an episode of the TV series Brandy & Mr. Whiskers
 "Dear Diary", an episode of the TV series Get Smart
 "Dear Diary", an episode of the TV series LazyTown
 "Dear Diary", an episode of the animated TV series Alvin and the Chipmunks
 "Dear Diary", an episode of the TV series ChuckleVision

Music

Albums 
 Dear Diary (Bonnie Pink album), 2010
 Dear Diary (Cha Cha album), 1999
 Dear Diary (FM Static album), 2009
 Dear Diary (Kid Courageous album), 2006
 Dear Diary (EP), by Yoon Ji-sung, 2019

Songs 
 "Dear Diary" (The Moody Blues song)
 "Dear Diary" (Namie Amuro song)
 "Dear Diary", by Britney Spears from Oops!... I Did It Again
 "Dear Diary", by Pink from Missundaztood
 "Dear Diary", by Róisín Murphy from Ruby Blue
 "Dear Diary", by Travis from The Invisible Band
 "Dear Diary,", by Bring Me the Horizon from Post Human: Survival Horror

Literature 
 Dear Diary, a novel by Jeanne Betancourt
 "Dear Diary", a 1954 science fiction short story by Richard Matheson

See also 
 Dear Diary, My Teen Angst Has a Body Count, an album by From First to Last